Starting in the late 1940s, several American comic book publishers sought out older audiences by creating a new genre: romance comics. Although the genre had waned in popularity by the 1970s, romance comics continue to be produced in the 2000s.

Titles

 100% (DC/Vertigo, 2002 – 2003)
 All True Romances (1955-1958)
 Boy Loves Girl (1952-1956)
 Brides in Love (Charlton Comics, 1956 – 1965)
 Career Girl Romances (Charlton Comics, 1964 - 1973)
 Cinderella Love (Ziff Davis/St. John Publications, 1950 – 1955) — acquired by St. John in 1953
 Cindy Comics (Marvel Comics, 1947 – 1950)
 Date with Debbi (DC, Jan./Feb. 1969 – 1972)
 A Date with Judy (79 issues, Oct./Nov. 1947-Nov. 1960)
 Diary Loves/G.I. Sweethearts/Girls in Love (Quality Comics, 1949 – 1956)
 Dotty Comics (Ace Magazines, 1948–1949) — Title changes to "Glamorous Romances" at issue #41
 Falling in Love (DC Comics, 1949 – 1973)
 First Love Illustrated (Harvey Comics, 1949 - 1963)
 Flaming Love (Quality Comics, 1949 – 1950)
 Forbidden Tales of Dark Mansion (DC Comics, 1971–1974) — started out as Gothic romance
 Girl Comics vol. 1 (Timely/Atlas, 1949 - 1954)
 Girls' Love Stories (DC Comics, 1949 – 1973)
 Girls' Romances (DC Comics, 1950 – 1971)
 Glamorous Romances (Ace Magazines, 1949–1956) — Formerly titled "Dotty Comics"
 Haunted Love (Charlton Comics, 1973 – 1975) — Gothic romance
 Heart Throbs (Quality Comics/DC Comics, 1949 – 1972) — acquired by DC in 1957
 Hi-School Romances (1949)
 Hollywood Romances/For Lovers Only (Charlton Comics, 1966 – 1976)
 I ♥ Marvel (Marvel Comics, 2006)
 I Love You (Charlton Comics, 1955 - 1980)
 Ideal Romance (Quality Comics, 1954 – 1955)
 Just Married (Charlton Comics, 1958 - 1976)
 Lore Olympus (WEBTOON, 2018–Present)
 Love and Romance (Charlton Comics, 1971 - 1975)
 Love Confessions (Quality Comics, 1949 – 1956)
 Love Diary (Charlton Comics, 1958 - 1976)
 Love Lessons (Harvey Comics, 1949 – 1950)
 Love Letters (Quality Comics, 1949 - 1956)
 Love Romances (Marvel Comics, 1949 - 1963)
 Love Scandals (Quality Comics, 1950)
 Lovelorn/Confessions of the Lovelorn (American Comics Group, 1949 - 1960)
 Millie the Model (Marvel Comics, 1945 - 1973)
 Modern Love (1949)
 My Date Comics (Hillman Periodicals, 1947–1948) — romance/humor mixture by Simon & Kirby
 My Love Life (Fox Comics, 1949 – 1951)
 My Love Secret... (Fox Comics, 1949 – 1950)
 My Only Love (Charlton Comics, 1975 - 1976)
 My Secret Life (Charlton Comics, 1957 - 1962)
 Night Nurse (Marvel Comics, 1972 – 1973)
 Our Love Story (Marvel Comics)
 Patsy Walker (Marvel Comics, 1945 - 1965)
 Popular Teen-Agers (Star Publications, 1950 – 1954)
 Radiant Love (Key Publications, 1953 – 1954)
 Range Romances (Quality Comics, 1949–1950) — Western/romance mix
 Romantic Adventures/My Romantic Adventures (American Comics Group, 1949 – 1964)
 Romance Tales (Marvel Comics, 1949 – 1950)
 Romantic Marriage (Ziff Davis/St. John Publications, 1950 – 1954) — acquired by St. John in 1953
 Romantic Secrets (Fawcett Comics/Charlton Comics, 1949 – 1964) — acquired from Fawcett in 1953
 Romantic Story (Fawcett Comics/Charlton Comics, 1949 - 1973) — acquired from Fawcett in 1954
 Secret Hearts (DC, 1949 - 1971)
 Secret Love Stories (Fox Comics, 1949)
 Secret Romance (Charlton Comics, 1968 - 1980)
 Secrets of Love And Marriage (Charlton Comics, 1956 - 1961)
 Sleepless (Image Comics, 2017–2019)
 Strange Confessions (Ziff Davis, 1952)
 Strange Love (Fox Comics, 1950)
 Superman's Girl Friend, Lois Lane (DC Comics, 1958 – 1974)
 Sweetheart Diary (Charlton Comics, 1955 - 1962)
 Sweethearts (Fawcett Comics/Charlton Comics, 1948 - 1973) — acquired from Fawcett in 1954
 Teen Confessions (Charlton Comics, 1959 - 1976)
 Teen-Age Confidential Confessions (Charlton Comics, 1960 - 1964)
 Teen-Age Love (Charlton Comics, 1958 - 1973)
 Teen-Age Romances (St. John Publications, 1949 – 1955)
 Teen-Age Temptations (St. John Publications, 1952 - 1954)
 Tender Romance/Ideal Romance/Diary Confessions (Key Publications, 1953 – 1956)
 Time for Love vol. 2 (Charlton Comics, 1967 - 1976)
 Trouble (Epic Comics, 2003)
 True Life Secrets (Charlton Comics, 1951 – 1956)
 True Stories of Romance (Fawcett Comics, 1950)
 True War Romances/Exotic Romances (Quality Comics, 1952 - 1956) — romance/war mix
 Untamed Love (Quality Comics, 1950)
 Wedding Bells (Quality Comics, 1954–1956)
 Young Love (Crestwood Publications, 1947 – 1956, 1960 – 1963; DC Comics, 1963 – 1977)
 Young Romance (Crestwood Publications/DC Comics, 1947 – 1975) — acquired from Crestwood in 1963

See also
List of romance manga

Romance comics